is a Japanese former pole vaulter. He was twice champion at the Asian Athletics Championships, winning in 1991 and 1995. He represented his country at the 1991 World Championships in Athletics and represented Asia at the 1992 IAAF World Cup.

At national level, he won at the 1995 National Sports Festival of Japan, and was twice winner at the Japan Championships in Athletics (1992 and 1995).
  
His personal best jump is 5.57 metres, achieved in July 1994.

International competitions

National titles
Japan Championships in Athletics
Pole vault: 1992, 1995
National Sports Festival of Japan
Pole vault: 1995

References

1970 births
Living people
Japanese male pole vaulters
World Athletics Championships athletes for Japan
Asian Athletics Championships winners
Japan Championships in Athletics winners